G 240-72 (or WD 1748+708, or LHS 455, or GJ 1221) is a nearby degenerate star (white dwarf) of spectral class DQP9.0, located in constellation Draco.

Distance
G 240-72 is the seventh closest white dwarf (after Sirius B, Procyon B, van Maanen's star, Gliese 440, 40 Eridani B and Stein 2051 B). Its trigonometric parallax is 0.1647 ± 0.0024 arcsec, corresponding to a distance 6.07 ± 0.09 pc, or 19.80 ly.

Properties
G 240-72 has mass 0.81 Solar masses and surface gravity 108.36 (2.29 · 108) cm·s−2, or approximately 234 000 of Earth's, corresponding to a radius 6850 km, or 107% of Earth's.

This white dwarf has relatively low temperature 5590 K (slightly cooler than the Sun), and old cooling age, i. e. age as degenerate star (not counting duration of previous existence as main sequence star and as giant star) 5.69 Gyr. It has a white appearance, due to its similar temperature to the Sun. It has a pure helium atmosphere and rotates very slowly, with period of possibly over 100 years.

References

Notes

External links
The 100 Nearest Star Systems (RECONS)

White dwarfs
Draco (constellation)
1221
J17480817+7052353